Judson Studios is a fine arts studio specializing in stained glass located in the Highland Park section (also known as Garvanza) of northeast Los Angeles. The stained glass studio was founded in the Mott Alley section of downtown Los Angeles in the mid-1890s by English-born artist William Lees Judson and his three sons. It moved to its current location in 1920 and remains in operation as a family-run business. The Judson Studios building was named a Historic-Cultural Landmark by the City of Los Angeles in 1969 and listed in the National Register of Historic Places in 1999.

Founder William Lees Judson 
William Lees Judson was born in 1842 in Manchester, England, and moved to the United States with his parents when he was ten years old. After serving four years with the Illinois volunteers during the American Civil War, Judson studied art in New York and Paris. He settled in London, Ontario, where he became a successful portrait painter and art teacher. He moved to Chicago in 1890 but, suffering from failing health, he moved to Los Angeles in 1893. He settled on the banks of the Arroyo Seco in the Garvanza section of Los Angeles and became part of an influential scene of artists in the Arroyo. A 1937 radio program noted that it was "love at first sight" when Judson saw the Arroyo Seco, and the area became his home for the rest of his life. Soon after his arrival, Judson was at the forefront of the Arroyo Guild of Craftsmen, a group of artists, sculptors and architects who fueled Southern California's Arts and Crafts Movement. The beauty of the area stirred Judson to switch from portrait painting to landscapes, and his work attracted such favorable attention that in 1896 he was offered a professorship in drawing and painting at the University of Southern California. In the late 1890s, he founded the Los Angeles College of Fine Arts at his home in Garvanza (the present location of Judson Studios). He died at his home in the studio building in October 1928.

Formation of Judson Studios 

After settling in Los Angeles, William Lees Judson saw the need for a local stained glass studio. In 1895, he persuaded three of his sons, Walter H., Lionel and Paul, to come to Los Angeles to join him in starting a stained glass studio. The family initially opened its stained glass business under the name Colonial Art Glass Co., in Mott Alley, located near the Old Plaza and Union Station in an area that was later demolished for the construction of the Hollywood Freeway.

In the studios' early years, its stained glass output was "balanced between religious and secular, between recreating the Gothic effect and working for Frank Lloyd Wright in glass and tile on the Ennis and Barnsdall Houses." In addition to stained glass, the Judsons also worked in tile and mosaic. The Judson operation became so highly regarded that it was able to recruit such major artists as A.E. Brain and Frederick Wilson away from America's premiere maker of stained glass, Louis Comfort Tiffany.

College of Fine Arts 
Judson started as a professor at McLeod's Los Angeles School of Art and Design. According to a radio broadcast transcript Judson's own art college became USC's College of Fine Arts and Judson moved the college to the building near his home in the Arroyo area in 1901. Other sources claim the school was in the Highland Park location from 1897 to 1920. He became Dean of the USC College of Fine Arts in 1913, and remained so until his retirement in 1922.

Original building 
The original three-story Islamic-style building on the Garvanza site was used as the campus for the USC College of Fine Arts starting in 1901. In December 1910, the building was destroyed by a fire that destroyed Judson's art works. Judson escaped from the burning building through a window and met his classes that day under the pepper trees on the property.

New facility built in 1911 
After fire destroyed the original building, a "rambling, two-story building" designed by Robert Train and Robert Edmund Williams was built on the site in 1911. The new building was the home of the USC College of Fine Arts until 1920, when USC moved the arts school to the central campus. With USC vacating the space, Judson Studios moved into the building. In its early years, the building was also the headquarters for a group called the Arroyo Craftsmen who made furniture and art objects for fine homes built in the area until World War I, including work fabricated for noted Arts and Crafts architects, Greene and Greene. Frequent visitors to the building included Frank Lloyd Wright, Ernest A. Batchelder and Henry and Charles Greene.

Operations of the studios 
When Walter H. Judson died in 1934, Horace T. Judson (grandson of William Lees) took over the day-to-day management of the business. Trained as a lawyer, Horace Judson retired from the active practice of law to continue the family's stained glass tradition. The studios were described in 1940 as "a medieval guild secluded from a hectic modern world by the vine-covered building." At the time, Horace Judson told the Highland Park News-Herald: "Here there is no rush. We work slowly and for perfection as they did six centuries ago."

As Southern California's population grew rapidly after World War II, there was a tremendous demand for church construction. This in turn led to a boom in business for Judson Studios. At the peak in the 1950s, Judson employed 30 craftsmen. Walter W. Judson later recalled, "It got so it almost became counterproductive. It was difficult to keep track of what was going on." As a result, Horace Judson established a rule that the studio would never again employ more than 15 craftsmen at once. Walter Judson, who took over the business from Horace (his father) in the 1970s, continued that rule, noting, "If you go over 15, you'll make more money. But you can lose your reputation too."

In 1973, Walter Judson noted that they preferred to train their own craftsmen and that it was difficult to find people fully interested in the craft: "They just want to play with it and then go off." By 1981, Judson Studios was still using "the old methods that have yet to be improved." Walter Judson noted, "We do use a lot more electricity and glass costs a lot more but that's about all that's changed." At the time, Judson was using glass from all over the world in more than 600 colors.

When the Los Angeles Times did a profile on the studios in 1986, there were nine artisans employed in the business, "employing techniques that have not changed much since the craft began to flourish in the 12th Century." In 1991, Walter Judson offered his opinion that contemporary stained-glass craftsmanship surpassed even the heyday of the art in the 11th and 12th centuries. He later added, "It's a unique business, because you're producing something that is a joy and a beauty to other people and it will be for centuries."

Though principally known for stained glass, Judson Studios also creates works in marble carving, mosaic, carved and etched glass, furniture and other specialty items.

As of 2017, Judson Studios remained a family-owned and operated business, with fifth generation David Judson, the great-great-grandson of William Lee Judson serving as the director of the business. In 2000, David Judson reported that 85% of the company's work was for religious institutions "of all different creeds, from Jewish to Christian to Islamic."

Demolition threat and historic designation 
Judson Studios was operated from 1920 to 1969 as a non-conforming use within a residential neighborhood. As a zoning variance neared its termination in 1969, the Judson family feared that the city would require demolition of the studios. In order to preserve the studios, the Los Angeles Cultural Heritage Board, with support from the Judson family, declared the building a Los Angeles Historic-Cultural Monument (No. 62) in August 1969. The declaration of historic status stated: The building was added to the National Register of Historic Places in 1999.

Examples of Judson stained glass 
Over its first century of operation, Judson Studios produced more than 10,000 stained-glass works. Stained glass made at Judson Studios can be found in locations throughout Southern California and the United States. Examples can be seen at:
 Hollyhock House at Barnsdall Art Park and Ennis House—Judson Studios provided leaded and stained glass and tiles for Frank Lloyd Wright's work on the Hollyhock and Ennis Houses
 The rotunda skylight at the Natural History Museum in Los Angeles
 The "Congressional Prayer Room", also known as the "Chapel of All Creeds", at the U.S. Capitol
 The United States Air Force Academy Cadet Chapel in Colorado Springs, Colorado
 Chapel One at Edwards Air Force Base in California
 The Alumni Memorial Window, done in heraldic style, at the Memorial Branch Library on Olympic Boulevard in Los Angeles, commemorating the alumni of Los Angeles High School who died in World War I
 The massive interior dome –  – at the Tropicana Resort & Casino in Las Vegas, built at a cost of $200,000
 The  Jewel Court Dome at South Coast Plaza in Costa Mesa, California
 The Caesars Palace Palace Court dome in Las Vegas
 Sun City Ginza in Tokyo
 Mary, Queen of the Universe Shrine in Orlando, Florida, for which Judson produced 94 stained-glass windows
 Highland Park Presbyterian Church in Los Angeles
 St. James' Episcopal Church in South Pasadena
 All Saints Church in Pasadena
 First Congregational Church in Los Angeles

 Calvary Presbyterian Church in South Pasadena (See image to the right) Viewable outside at night
 Westminster Presbyterian Church in Los Angeles. Judson of Los Angeles designed the stained glass windows in 1930 for the newly built former St. Paul Presbyterian Church at 2230 West Jefferson Blvd.
 "The Life of Christ" window series at St. Barnabas Church in Eagle Rock
 The Stanford Court Hotel in Nob Hill section of San Francisco
 A heraldic design featuring white lions and tigers for Las Vegas illusionists Siegfried & Roy
 Toluca Lake United Methodist Church in North Hollywood, where Judson began making stained glass windows in 1958 and was still installing windows in 1992
 The tree of life window in the Lopaty Chapel at Valley Beth Shalom in Encino, California, made from 20,000 pieces of glass, with 613 leaves on the tree
 The Arbor of Light Radiance Corridor at the Mountain View Mausoleum in Altadena, California
 The Diamond Head Mortuary in Honolulu, Hawaii
 The Goldman Estate in Honolulu
 Honolulu International Country Club
 All Saints Episcopal Church, San Diego, stained glass work completed between 1957 and 1967

Church of the Resurrection 

This new work is Judson Studio's most ambitious both in size and technical difficulty. New techniques using fused glass had to be developed and a new facility had to be built in order to accomplish the task in nearby South Pasadena.

Public activities 
The Judson Gallery hosts changing art exhibits that are open to the public. The Studios also offers 1-hour tours of the workshops and galleries for $20 per person every second Thursday of the month.

See also 
 List of Los Angeles Historic-Cultural Monuments on the East and Northeast Sides
 National Register of Historic Places listings in Los Angeles

References

External links 
 

American Craftsman architecture in California
History of Los Angeles
Buildings and structures on the National Register of Historic Places in Los Angeles
Art museums and galleries in Los Angeles
1911 establishments in California
Shingle Style architecture in California
Bungalow architecture in California
Los Angeles Historic-Cultural Monuments
Highland Park, Los Angeles